Renee Jane Paquette is a Canadian-American television personality working as a backstage interviewer for All Elite Wrestling (AEW). She was previously known for her time in WWE between 2012 and 2020, where she served as a commentator, presenter, and interviewer under the ring name Renee Young. During her time in WWE, Young also appeared as a main cast member on the reality television series Total Divas. Prior to signing with WWE, she was a sports broadcaster for The Score Television Network.

Early life 
Renee Jane Paquette was born in Toronto, Ontario, Canada. After high school, she applied to several colleges and began training in improv comedy. At the age of 19, she relocated to Los Angeles to pursue a career as a comedic actress, but later moved back to Toronto and auditioned for films, music videos, and commercials there instead. After becoming frustrated with her lack of auditions, she became interested in broadcasting instead of acting.

Career

The Score Television Network (2009–2012) 
Paquette began working for The Score Television Network in 2009 on a program called Right After Wrestling, later renamed Aftermath, where she presented alongside broadcasters Arda Ocal and Mauro Ranallo as well as former WWE referee Jimmy Korderas.

WWE (2012–2020) 

Paquette signed with the American professional wrestling promotion WWE in October 2012, where she was initially given the ring name Renee Sterling before choosing the name Renee Young (a nod to Neil Young). Her first appearance was as a co-host on the 2012 Survivor Series pre-show alongside Scott Stanford. Young then debuted on the January 23, 2013, episode of NXT as a backstage interviewer. She began performing interviews exclusively for WWE Active in February 2013. Renee made her SmackDown debut on the March 29 episode, interviewing Randy Orton, Big Show, and Sheamus.

Young began co-hosting the World Tour segments, which was a segment detailing the city they were filming in, showcasing various tourist attractions, before later being promoted as a third main presenter on the JBL and Cole Show, which was shown on YouTube and WWE's website, until its cancellation in June 2015. It received a Slammy Award for Favorite Web Show of the Year. She also presented WWE Vintage Collection alongside Gene Okerlund.

In September 2013, Young made her commentary debut on NXT. She began performing color commentary during women's matches, before later becoming a full-time color commentator on NXT for several months. From July 3, 2014, to January 9, 2015, Young served as a color commentator on Superstars, alongside Tom Phillips, which made her WWE's first full-time female announcer in more than a decade. In April 2015, Young began hosting her own WWE Network show, Unfiltered with Renee Young, in which she interviews fellow WWE employees. In June, Young served as the co-host of the sixth season of Tough Enough, alongside Chris Jericho.

On the December 20, 2016, episode of SmackDown, Young interviewed Intercontinental Champion The Miz following his successful title defense against Apollo Crews. After Young asked Miz about his "obsession" with Dean Ambrose, Miz sarcastically responded by revealing Young and Ambrose's real-life relationship, prompting her to slap Miz. On December 27, Young was confronted by The Miz's real-life wife, Maryse, backstage on SmackDown. Maryse slapped Young the following week in retaliation, for which she was fined.

Young filled in for Jonathan Coachman as a guest commentator on the August 13, 2018, episode of Raw, making her the first woman to call an entire episode of Raw. Young joined the Raw commentary team full-time the following month and became the first permanent female commentator on the program. Beginning in October 2019, Young moved to SmackDown as a "special contributor" and began co-hosting the new studio program WWE Backstage on Fox Sports 1 with Booker T. On November 1, 2019, Young filled in as commentator on SmackDown, as Michael Cole and Corey Graves missed the episode due to travel delays returning from Crown Jewel. Young announced her departure from WWE at SummerSlam in August 2020, stating that the event would be her last appearance with the company. Young explained that she left WWE because of the cancelation of WWE Backstage and that she felt that she had accomplished everything in WWE.

Post-WWE work (2021–present) 
Paquette, as Renee Young, returned for a special SmackDown pre-show on Friday, October 16, co-hosting the kickoff show alongside Booker T as a part of the celebration of season two of SmackDown on Fox. Paquette made a special appearance on the return of WWE Backstage, for the January 30, 2021, episode, promoting the upcoming Royal Rumble, with her returning co-hosts Paige, and Booker T.

In 2021, Paquette began her own podcast Oral Sessions with Renee Paquette (later renamed The Sessions with Renee Paquette). In addition to the podcast, she created her own YouTube channel to accompany the audio episodes in the form of video clips, and full podcast episodes, under the channel name of Renee Paquette. In September 2021, she also began hosting a show on Sirius XM with former Strikeforce and UFC Women's Bantamweight Champion Miesha Tate called Throwing Down with Renee and Miesha.

All Elite Wrestling (2022–present) 
On October 12, 2022, Tony Khan confirmed via his social media account that Paquette had signed with All Elite Wrestling (AEW). She made her debut the same night on Dynamite.

Other media 
Before joining The Score, Paquette worked for BiteTV, where she presented a show about extreme sports and music called Rippin' It-N-Lippin' It during 2008 and 2009. She appeared in a commercial for Oxy and had a part in a Tom Green music video. Prior to this, she had a cameo in the music video for Kelly Clarkson's 2005 song "Behind These Hazel Eyes". She also appeared in a national Noxzema commercial and did a photoshoot for Toro Magazine. In 2016, Paquette began appearing as a main cast member for the sixth season of Total Divas. She had previously appeared in several episodes on a recurring basis. She also hosted the podcast Regular Girls with Stacy McGunnigle.

Personal life 
Paquette began dating American professional wrestler Jonathan Good (better known as Jon Moxley and formerly Dean Ambrose) in 2013. They were married at their Las Vegas home in an impromptu ceremony in the early hours of April 9, 2017. In November 2020, Paquette and Good announced that they were expecting their first child. Their daughter, Nora Murphy Good, was born on June 15, 2021.

Paquette is a fan of the Vegas Golden Knights ice hockey team. On being a wrestling fan in both her childhood and adulthood, she said, "I attended a few events and WrestleMania VI. My dad is a concert promoter, and he'd get me into the events. I remember being backstage and meeting Stone Cold Steve Austin, Triple H, Chyna, and Trish Stratus as a kid, so it's really funny to me that I ended up here. I went on a different path than wanting to become a WWE Superstar."

In March 2021, Paquette announced that she became an American citizen. In May, she released her cookbook Messy in the Kitchen: My Guide to Eating Deliciously, Hosting Fabulously and Sipping Copiously.

Bibliography 
 Messy In The Kitchen: My Guide to Eating Deliciously, Hosting Fabulously and Sipping Copiously (2021)

Filmography

Film

Television

Web

Awards and accomplishments 
 WWE
 Slammy Award for Favorite Web Show of the Year (2013) – with Michael Cole and John "Bradshaw" Layfield for The JBL and Cole Show

Bibliography

References

External links 

 
 
 
 

Canadian colour commentators
Canadian emigrants to the United States
Canadian sports announcers
Canadian television reporters and correspondents
Canadian women podcasters
Canadian podcasters
Canadian women television journalists
Canadian YouTubers
People with acquired American citizenship
American color commentators
American sports announcers
American television reporters and correspondents
American women podcasters
American podcasters
American women television journalists
American YouTubers
Living people
Professional wrestling announcers
Professional wrestling podcasters
Sportspeople from Toronto
Twitch (service) streamers
Women cookbook writers
21st-century American women
Year of birth missing (living people)
All Elite Wrestling personnel